Patriarch Paul II may refer to:

 Paul II the Black of Alexandria, Patriarch of Antioch and head of the Syriac Orthodox Church in 550–575
 Paul II of Constantinople, Ecumenical Patriarch in 642–653
 Paul II, Serbian Patriarch, Archbishop of Peć and Serbian Patriarch in 1990–2009